Post-structuralism is a term for philosophical and literary forms of theory that both build upon and reject ideas established by structuralism, the intellectual project that preceded it. Although post-structuralists all present different critiques of structuralism, common themes among them include the rejection of the self-sufficiency of structuralism, as well as an interrogation of the binary oppositions that constitute its structures. Accordingly, post-structuralism discards the idea of interpreting media (or the world) within pre-established, socially constructed structures.

Structuralism proposes that human culture can be understood by means of a structure that is modeled on language. As a result, there is concrete reality on the one hand, abstract ideas about reality on the other hand, and a "third order" that mediates between the two. A post-structuralist critique, then, might suggest that in order to build meaning out of such an interpretation, one must (falsely) assume that the definitions of these signs are both valid and fixed, and that the author employing structuralist theory is somehow above and apart from these structures they are describing so as to be able to wholly appreciate them. The rigidity and tendency to categorize intimations of universal truths found in structuralist thinking is a common target of post-structuralist thought, while also building upon structuralist conceptions of reality mediated by the interrelationship between signs.

Writers whose works are often characterised as post-structuralist include Roland Barthes, Jacques Derrida, Michel Foucault, Gilles Deleuze, and Jean Baudrillard, although many theorists who have been called "post-structuralist" have rejected the label.

Post-structuralism and structuralism 
Structuralism, as an intellectual movement in France in the 1950s and 1960s, studied underlying structures in cultural products (such as texts) and used analytical concepts from linguistics, psychology, anthropology, and other fields to interpret those structures. Structuralism posits the concept of binary opposition, in which frequently-used pairs of opposite-but-related words (concepts) are often arranged in a hierarchy; for example: Enlightenment/Romantic, female/male, speech/writing, rational/emotional, signified/signifier, symbolic/imaginary, and east/west.

Post-structuralism rejects the structuralist notion that the dominant word in a pair is dependent on its subservient counterpart, and instead argues that founding knowledge on either pure experience (phenomenology) or on systematic structures (structuralism) is impossible, because history and culture actually condition the study of underlying structures, and these are subject to biases and misinterpretations. Gilles Deleuze and others saw this impossibility not as a failure or loss, but rather as a cause for "celebration and liberation." A post-structuralist approach argues that to understand an object (a text, for example), one must study both the object itself and the systems of knowledge that produced the object. The uncertain boundaries between structuralism and post-structuralism become further blurred by the fact that scholars rarely label themselves as post-structuralists. Some scholars associated with structuralism, such as Roland Barthes and Michel Foucault, also became noteworthy in post-structuralism.

History 
Post-structuralism emerged in France during the 1960s as a movement critiquing structuralism. According to J. G. Merquior, a love–hate relationship with structuralism developed among many leading French thinkers in the 1960s. The period was marked by the rebellion of students and workers against the state in May 1968.

In a 1966 lecture titled "Structure, Sign, and Play in the Discourse of the Human Sciences", Jacques Derrida presented a thesis on an apparent rupture in intellectual life. Derrida interpreted this event as a "decentering" of the former intellectual cosmos. Instead of progress or divergence from an identified centre, Derrida described this "event" as a kind of "play."

A year later, Roland Barthes published "The Death of the Author", in which he announced a metaphorical event: the "death" of the author as an authentic source of meaning for a given text. Barthes argued that any literary text has multiple meanings and that the author was not the prime source of the work's semantic content.  The "Death of the Author," Barthes maintained, was the "Birth of the Reader," as the source of the proliferation of meanings of the text.

Barthes and the need for metalanguage
In Elements of Semiology (1967), Barthes advances the concept of the metalanguage, a systematized way of talking about concepts like meaning and grammar beyond the constraints of a traditional (first-order) language; in a metalanguage, symbols replace words and phrases. Insofar as one metalanguage is required for one explanation of the first-order language, another may be required, so metalanguages may actually replace first-order languages. Barthes exposes how this structuralist system is regressive; orders of language rely upon a metalanguage by which it is explained, and therefore deconstruction itself is in danger of becoming a metalanguage, thus exposing all languages and discourse to scrutiny. Barthes' other works contributed deconstructive theories about texts.

Derrida's lecture at Johns Hopkins 
The occasional designation of post-structuralism as a movement can be tied to the fact that mounting criticism of Structuralism became evident at approximately the same time that Structuralism became a topic of interest in universities in the United States. This interest led to a colloquium at Johns Hopkins University in 1966 titled "The Languages of Criticism and the Sciences of Man", to which such French philosophers as Jacques Derrida, Roland Barthes, and Jacques Lacan were invited to speak.

Derrida's lecture at that conference, "Structure, Sign, and Play in the Human Sciences", was one of the earliest to propose some theoretical limitations to Structuralism, and to attempt to theorize on terms that were clearly no longer structuralist.

The element of "play" in the title of Derrida's essay is often erroneously interpreted in a linguistic sense, based on a general tendency towards puns and humour, while social constructionism as developed in the later work of Michel Foucault is said to create play in the sense of strategic agency by laying bare the levers of historical change. Many see the importance of Foucault's work to be in its synthesis of this social/historical account of the operation of power.

Criticism
Some observers from outside of the post-structuralist camp have questioned the rigour and legitimacy of the field. American philosopher John Searle
suggested in 1990: "The spread of 'poststructuralist' literary theory is perhaps the best-known example of a silly but non-catastrophic phenomenon." Similarly, physicist Alan Sokal in 1997 criticized "the postmodernist/poststructuralist gibberish that is now hegemonic in some sectors of the American academy."

Literature scholar Norman Holland in 1992 saw post-structuralism as flawed due to reliance on Saussure's linguistic model, which was seriously challenged by the 1950s and was soon abandoned by linguists:Saussure's views are not held, so far as I know, by modern linguists, only by literary critics and the occasional philosopher. [Strict adherence to Saussure] has elicited wrong film and literary theory on a grand scale. One can find dozens of books of literary theory bogged down in signifiers and signifieds, but only a handful that refers to Chomsky."David Foster Wallace wrote:

See also

Authors
The following are often said to be post-structuralists, or to have had a post-structuralist period:

 Kathy Acker
 Jean Baudrillard
 Roland Barthes
 Wendy Brown 
 Judith Butler
 Rey Chow
 Hélène Cixous
 Gilles Deleuze
 Jacques Derrida
 Umberto Eco
 John Fiske
 Michel Foucault
 René Girard
 Félix Guattari
 Luce Irigaray
 Julia Kristeva
 Teresa de Lauretis
 Sarah Kofman
 Philippe Lacoue-Labarthe
 Jean-François Lyotard
 Chantal Mouffe
 Jean-Luc Nancy
 Avital Ronell
 Bernard Stiegler

References

Sources

 Angermuller, J. (2015): Why There Is No Poststructuralism in France. The Making of an Intellectual Generation. London: Bloomsbury.
 Angermuller, J. (2014): Poststructuralist Discourse Analysis. Subjectivity in Enunciative Pragmatics. Houndmills, Basingstoke: Palgrave Macmillan
 Barry, P. Beginning theory: an introduction to literary and cultural theory. Manchester University Press, Manchester, 2002.
 Barthes, Roland. Elements of Semiology. New York: Hill and Wang, 1967.
 Cuddon, J. A. Dictionary of Literary Terms & Literary Theory. London: Penguin, 1998.
 Eagleton, T.  Literary theory: an introduction Basil Blackwell, Oxford,1983.
 Matthews, E. Twentieth-Century French Philosophy. Oxford University Press, Oxford, 1996.
 
 Ryan, M. Literary theory: a practical introduction. Blackwell Publishers Inc, Massachusetts,1999.
 Wolfreys, J & Baker, W (eds). Literary theories: a case study in critical performance. Macmillan Press, Hong Kong,1996.

External links

Structure, Sign, and Play in the Discourse of the Human Sciences - Jacques Derrida

"Some Post-Structural Assumptions" - John Lye
Talking pomo: An analysis of the post-modern movement, by Steve Mizrach
Information on Michel Foucault, including an archive of writings and lectures
poststructuralism.info - A collaborative website that aims to allow users not only to describe post-structuralist ideas but to create new ideas and concepts based on post-structuralist foundations

 
Philosophical schools and traditions
Postmodern theory
Linguistic turn